The GCC Champions League, is an annually organized football league tournament for club of the Arabian peninsula.

The 2012 edition was the 27th time that it has been organized.

The Groups

Four groups of three teams.

Top two from each group qualify for the one legged quarter finals with group winners hosting the matches.

Groups

Group A

Group B

Group C

Group D

Quarter finals

Semi finals

1st Legs

2nd Legs

Al Wasl advanced to the final 4–2 on aggregate

Al Muharraq advanced to the final 3–2 on aggregate

Final

1st Leg

2nd Leg

Al Muharraq became champions, winning on penalties, the first team from Bahrain to be crowned champions.

References

External links
2012 GCC Champions League at Soccerway
2012 GCC Champions League at goalzz

2012
2012 in Asian football